A divided city is one which, as a consequence of political changes or border shifts, currently constitutes (or once constituted) two separate entities, or an urban area with a border running through it. Listed below are the localities and the state they belonged to at the time of division.

Especially notable examples of divided cities are divided capitals, including Nicosia (since 1974, ongoing), Jerusalem (1948–1967 de jure; ongoing since 1948), and Berlin (1949–1990).

Former cities now divided
 Tell Abyad, divided along the Baghdad Railway under the Treaty of Ankara in 1921
 Tell Abyad, Syria
 Akçakale, Turkey
 Arappınar, divided along the Baghdad Railway under the Treaty of Ankara in 1921
 Kobanî, Syria
 Mürşitpınar, Turkey
Astara, divided under the Treaty of Turkmenchay (1828)
Astara, Azerbaijan
Astara, Iran
 Baarle, divided since 1194, modern NL–BE division since 1831
 Baarle-Nassau, Netherlands
 Baarle-Hertog, Belgium
 Bad Muskau, Germany
 Bad Muskau, Germany
 Łęknica, Poland
 Bad Radkersburg, Austria-Hungary
 Bad Radkersburg, Austria
 Gornja Radgona, Kingdom of Serbs, Croats and Slovenes (now Slovenia)
 Berlin (since reunited) in Germany
 West Berlin, closely associated with West Germany
 East Berlin, East Germany
 Bliederstroff, Lorraine (officially divided under the Treaty of Paris in 1815)
 Grosbliederstroff, France
 Kleinblittersdorf, Germany
 Bratislava, Czechoslovakia
 Bratislava, Slovakia
 Engerau (Petržalka), Austria (reunited after World War II)
 Bristol, U.S.
 Bristol, Tennessee
 Bristol, Virginia
 Brod-on-Sava, Kingdom of Yugoslavia
 Brod in Bosnia and Herzegovina
 Slavonski Brod in Croatia
 Carmen de Patagones, Argentina
Carmen de Patagones, Buenos Aires Province, Argentina
Viedma, Río Negro Province, Argentina
 Coolangatta and Tweed Heads, Australia
Coolangatta, Queensland
Tweed Heads, New South Wales
 Deryneia, Cyprus (de facto divided since 1974)
 Deryneia, Cyprus
 Kato Deryneia, North Cyprus
 Dibba, Portuguese fort
 Dibba Al-Fujairah (دبا الفجيرة), ruled by the Emirate of Fujairah, UAE
 Dibba Al-Hisn (دبا الحصن), ruled by the Emirate of Sharjah, UAE
 Dibba Al-Baya (دبا البيعة), ruled by the Governorate of Musandam, Oman
 El Paso del Norte, Mexico (divided in 1848 after the Mexican–American War)
 El Paso, Texas, United States
 Ciudad Juárez, Mexico
 Frankfurt (Oder), Germany
 Frankfurt (Oder), East Germany, now Germany
 Słubice, Poland
 Forst (Lausitz), Germany
 Forst (Lausitz), Germany
 Zasieki, Poland
 Galkayo, Somalia
 North Galkayo (administered by Puntland)
 South Galkayo (administered by Galmudug)
 Ghajar divided between Israel and Lebanon
 Gmünd, Austria-Hungary
 Gmünd, Austria
 České Velenice, Czechoslovakia, now Czech Republic
 Gorizia, Italy
 Gorizia, Italy
 Nova Gorica, Yugoslavia, now Slovenia
 Görlitz, Germany
 Görlitz, East Germany, now Germany 60,000
 Zgorzelec, Poland 38,000
 Guben, Germany
 Guben, East Germany, now Germany 22,000
 Gubin, Poland 19,000
 Herzogenrath, divided since 1815 at the Congress of Vienna (before that, department of Meuse-Inférieure)
 Herzogenrath, Germany (47,187)
 Kerkrade, Netherlands (47,681)
 Hili, India, divided since 1947 after partition of India
 Hili, India
 Hili, East Pakistan, now Bangladesh (1971–)
 Jerusalem (de facto reunited in 1967)
 West Jerusalem, Israel
 East Jerusalem (al-Quds), under Jordanian control 1948–1967, under Israeli control since 1967, claimed by Jordan 1967–1988; widely recognized as Palestinian territory under Israeli occupation 1988–present
Julfa, divided under the Treaty of Turkmenchay (1828)
Julfa, Azerbaijan
Jolfa, Iran
 Komárom, Austria-Hungary
 Komárom, Hungary
 Komárno, Czechoslovakia, now Slovakia
 Kosovska Mitrovica, Kosovo
 ethnic-Albanian south (Republic of Kosovo-controlled)
 ethnic-Serb north (North Kosovo)
 Küstrin, Germany
 Kostrzyn nad Odrą, Poland
 Küstrin-Kietz, Germany
 Laredo, New Spain/Mexico (note: Mexican city was founded when the border was established, by people moving over the border from what had just become the US city)
 Laredo, Texas
 Nuevo Laredo, Tamaulipas
 Laufenburg, divided between Switzerland and Germany
 Laufenburg, Switzerland
 Laufenburg, Germany
 Lloydminster, Canada, divided between Alberta and Saskatchewan, 1905–1930
 The community was founded in 1903 in what was then the Northwest Territories, and located on the Fourth Meridian of the Dominion Land Survey, which became the boundary between the newly created provinces two years later. In 1930, the community was reunited as a single town under the shared jurisdiction of both provinces, and reincorporated as a single city in 1958.
 Lo Wu (the romanization used in Hong Kong) / Luohu (the romanization used in mainland China)
 1898–1911: divided between the Qing Empire and British Hong Kong
 1912–1939: divided between Kwangtung Province, Republic of China and British Hong Kong
 1939–1941: divided between Japanese occupation zone (pronounced Rakō) and British Hong Kong
 1941–1945: both under Japanese occupation.
 1945–1949: divided between Kwangtung Province, Republic of China and British Hong Kong
 1949–1997: divided between Guangdong Province, People's Republic of China and British Hong Kong
 1997–present: the People's Republic of China possesses the sovereignty of the entire town since Hong Kong was handed over to the People's Republic of China by the United Kingdom in 1997; the part that was previously possessed by British Hong Kong is now administered by the Hong Kong Special Administrative Region, and the rest of the town is still administered by Guangdong Province. Border controls are still in use.
 Mödlareuth, Germany (now without boundary wall)
 Mödlareuth, Gefell, Thuringia, East Germany
 Mödlareuth, Töpen, Bavaria, West Germany
 Moyale, divided between Kenya and Ethiopia
 Narva, Estonia
 Narva, Estonia
 Ivangorod, Russia
 Nicosia, capital of Cyprus, divided since 1974 after the Turkish invasion on the island and still divided (North Nicosia).
 Nogales, Arizona, U.S., Nogales, Sonora, Mexico
 Padang Besar, Malay Peninsula, divided between Malaysia and Thailand. (Note: as the history of the area is somewhat hazy, it is not clear whether the town constituted a single settlement divided by an international border, or is instead an example of a geographical twin city. However, both towns' names, and the majority of their inhabitants, are of Malay origin.)
 Padang Besar, Malaysia
 Padang Besar, Thailand
 Pello
Planaltina, Brazil when Federal District was set as the new national capital in 1960
Planaltina, Federal District
Planaltina, Goiás
 Rafah divided between the Gaza Strip and Egypt
 Rafah, Egypt
 Resülayn, divided along the Baghdad Railway under the Treaty of Ankara in 1921
 Ra's al-'Ayn, Syria
 Ceylanpınar, Turkey
 Rheinfelden
Rheinfelden (Aargau) (Switzerland)
Rheinfelden (Baden) (Germany)
 Rijeka, Croatia
 Fiume, Italy (1924–1944)
 Sušak, Kingdom of Yugoslavia (reunited after World War II)
 Rome, Papal States
 Rome, Italy
 Vatican City
 Sha Tau Kok (the romanization used in Hong Kong) / Shatoujiao (the romanization used in mainland China)
 1898–1911: divided between the Qing Empire and British Hong Kong
 1912–1939: divided between Kwangtung Province, Republic of China and British Hong Kong
 1939–1941: divided between Japanese occupation zone (pronounced Satōgaku) and British Hong Kong
 1941–1945: both under Japanese occupation.
 1945–1949: divided between Kwangtung Province, Republic of China and British Hong Kong
 1949–1997: divided between Guangdong Province, People's Republic of China and British Hong Kong
 1997–present: the People's Republic of China possesses the sovereignty of the entire town since Hong Kong was handed over to the People's Republic of China by the United Kingdom in 1997; the part that was previously possessed by British Hong Kong is now administered by the Hong Kong Special Administrative Region, and the rest of the town is still administered by Guangdong Province. Border controls are still in use.
 Saint-Gingolph, Switzerland (since March 4, 1569)
 Saint-Gingolph, Switzerland
 Saint-Gingolph, France
 Saltney, divided between England and Wales
 Sarajevo, capital of Bosnia and Herzegovina, after the Dayton Agreement which politically defined the country's political structure, has most of the city within the Federation of Bosnia and Herzegovina, while some suburbs are within the boundaries of the other entity, Republika Srpska.
 Sátoraljaújhely, Austria-Hungary
 Sátoraljaújhely, Hungary
 Slovenské Nové Mesto, Czechoslovakia, now Slovakia
 Teschen, Austrian Silesia
 Cieszyn, Poland
 Český Těšín, Czechoslovakia, now Czech Republic
 Texarkana, United States
 Texarkana, Texas
 Texarkana, Arkansas
 Walk, Livonia
 Valga, Estonia
 Valka, Latvia
 Veľké Slemence
 divided between Slovakia and Ukraine (connected with an exclusive border just for the village, the only one in the Schengen area)
 Washington, DC, U.S., and suburbs
Washington, DC
Georgetown (Washington, D.C.)—originally in Maryland, moved to the District of Columbia
Alexandria, Virginia—originally in Virginia, moved to District of Columbia, moved back to Virginia

Cities that arose next to each other across a boundary line 
Aceguá, Brazil/Uruguay
Aceguá, Brazil
Aceguá, Uruguay
Aflao/Lomé
Aflao, Ghana
Lomé, Togo
Brazzaville/Kinshasa
Brazzaville, Republic of the Congo
Kinshasa, Democratic Republic of the Congo
Blagoveshchensk/Heihe
Blagoveshchensk, Russia
Heihe, China
Ciudad Juárez–El Paso, U.S./Mexico
Ciudad Juárez, Chihuahua
El Paso, Texas
Chandigarh, Panchkula, Mohali
Chandigarh, India
Mohali, Punjab, India
Panchkula, Haryana, India
Chuí/Chuy, Brazil/Uruguay
Chuí, Brazil
Chuy, Uruguay
Como/Chiasso
Como, Italy
Chiasso, Switzerland
Derby Line/Stanstead
Derby Line, Vermont
Stanstead, Québec
 Detroit–Windsor
 Detroit, Michigan
 Windsor, Ontario
 Islamabad–Rawalpindi
 Islamabad, Islamabad Capital Territory, Pakistan
 Rawalpindi, Punjab, Pakistan
Jaigaon/Phuntsholing
Jaigaon, Republic of India
Phuntsholing, Kingdom of Bhutan
Johor Bahru/Singapore
Johor Bahru, Malaysia
Singapore
Kara-Suu/Qorasuv
Kara-Suu, Kyrgyzstan
Qorasuv, Uzbekistan
Khorgas
Khorgas, China
Qorgas, Kazakhstan
Konstanz/Kreuzlingen
Konstanz, Germany
Kreuzlingen, Switzerland
Leticia/Tabatinga
Leticia, Colombia
Tabatinga, Brazil
Monaco and its French suburbs
In Monaco: Monte-Carlo, Monaco-Ville, Fontvielle, Larvotto
In France: Beausoleil, Alpes-Maritimes, Les Moneghetti, Saint-Antoine, Figuiera, Les Salines
Ottawa/Gatineau, National Capital Region (Canada)
Ottawa, Ontario, Canada
Gatineau, Quebec, Canada
Niagara Falls, U.S./Canada
Niagara Falls, New York
Niagara Falls, Ontario
Philadelphia/Camden, United States
Philadelphia, Pennsylvania
Camden, New Jersey
New York City and its neighbors (Jersey City, West New York, Hoboken, etc.) across the Hudson River
Rivera/Santana do Livramento, Uruguay/Brazil
 Rivera, Uruguay
 Santana do Livramento, Brazil
 San Diego-Tijuana, U.S./Mexico
 San Diego, California
 Tijuana, Baja California
Sault Ste. Marie, U.S./Canada
Sault Ste. Marie, Michigan, United States
Sault Ste. Marie, Ontario, Canada
Shenzhen, China/Hong Kong
Shenzhen, Guangdong
Hong Kong

Texhoma, United States
Texhoma, Oklahoma
Texhoma, Texas
Texarkana, United States
Texarkana, Texas
Texarkana, Arkansas
 Torneå, Kingdom of Sweden
 Tornio, Finland
 Haparanda, Sweden
 Union City, United States
 Union City, Indiana
 Union City, Ohio
Póvoa de Varzim, Portugal grew to territory of Vila do Conde since the 18th century. Although it is not clear that the territory actually was in Vila do Conde limits. Ideas to merge the towns arose in the 19th century.
Póvoa de Varzim
Vila do Conde
Giurgiu/Ruse
Giurgiu, Romania
Ruse, Bulgaria
 Tricity, Poland consists of Gdańsk and Sopot which were part of Free City of Danzig, and Gdynia which was built near them as a port of the Second Polish Republic. Since 1945 all are in Poland.
Tachileik/Mae Sai
Tachileik, Myanmar
Mae Sai, Thailand
 Zvornik, after the dismemberment of Yugoslavia, remains divided between Bosnia and Herzegovina and Serbia
 Zvornik, Bosnia and Herzegovina
 Mali Zvornik, Serbia

See also
Border town
Cross-border town naming
List of divided islands
Transborder agglomeration

Notes and references
Notes:

References:

Divided